The 2001 Utah State Aggies football team represented Utah State University as an independent during the 2003 NCAA Division I-A football season. The Aggies were led by second-year head coach Mick Dennehy and played their home games in Romney Stadium in Logan, Utah.

Schedule

References

Utah State
Utah State Aggies football seasons
Utah State Aggies football